Clark and Sorrell Garage is a historic automobile repair shop located at Durham, Durham County, North Carolina. It was built in 1932, and is a one-story brick building, three bays wide and four bays deep, with a flat tar and gravel roof. It was expanded about 1941 with a seven bay, brick-faced addition. The addition features an Art Moderne style entrance with a stuccoed surround. Attached to the garage is a two-story office building. It is the oldest auto repair garage still in operation in the city.

It was listed on the National Register of Historic Places in 2000.

References

External links
Open Durham.org

Commercial buildings on the National Register of Historic Places in North Carolina
Moderne architecture in North Carolina
Commercial buildings completed in 1932
Buildings and structures in Durham, North Carolina
National Register of Historic Places in Durham County, North Carolina